Ted Peters may refer to:

 Ted Peters (politician) (1897–1980), Australian politician
 Ted Peters (theologian) (born 1941), Lutheran theologian
Ted Peters Famous Smoked Fish

See also
Edward Peters (disambiguation)